The 1948 Richmond Spiders football team was an American football team that represented the University of Richmond as a member of the Southern Conference (SoCon) during the 1948 college football season. In their first season under head coach Karl Esleeck, Richmond compiled a 5–3–2 record, with a mark of 3–1–1 in conference play, finishing in eighth place in the SoCon.

Schedule

References

Richmond
Richmond Spiders football seasons
Richmond Spiders football